The Kung Sheung Daily News was a Chinese language newspaper published in Hong Kong under British colonial rule. It was a pro-Kuomintang newspaper and ran according to the Minguo calendar.

In tandem with The Kung Sheung Evening News, it was published by "The Industrial and Commercial Daily Press Limited", which was incorporated on 10 November 1928. The publisher was wound up on 26 December 1996, many years after the newspapers ceased publication.

The Kung Sheung Daily News was also published as an "export imprint", targeting Taiwan.

History
Sir Robert Ho Tung acquired Kung Sheung Daily News in 1929. At the time, the newspaper was a loss-making business. Under Ho Tung's ownership, it became one of the three leading Chinese language newspapers in Hong Kong in the 1950s (the other two being Sing Tao Daily and Wah Kiu Yat Po), according to the Newspaper Society of Hong Kong.

Shortly after the signing of the Sino-British Joint Declaration, Kung Sheung Daily News ceased publication, saying it was failing to make a profit and could not see a way forward.

Gallery

References

External links

Chinese-language newspapers published in Hong Kong
Defunct newspapers published in Hong Kong